Megachile bomplandensis is a species of bee in the family Megachilidae. It was described by Silvana Patricia Durante in 1996.

References

Bomplandensis
Insects described in 1996